District 1 is a legislative district within the Michigan House of Representatives located in the northeastern corner of Wayne County, Michigan, including the Upper East Side of Detroit and the Cities of Harper Woods, Grosse Pointe Woods, and Grosse Pointe Shores. It has a 2010 population of over 83,000.

List of representatives

Historic District Boundaries

Recent Elections

References 

Michigan House of Representatives districts
Government of Detroit
Metro Detroit